is a passenger railway station located in the town of Moroyama, Saitama, Japan, operated by the private railway operator Tōbu Railway.

Lines
During the daytime, the station is served by four trains per hour in each direction.

Station layout
The station consists of an island platform serving two tracks. The station entrance is on the south side of the station, connected to the platforms by a footbridge at the east (Sakado) end of the platform. A footbridge served by lifts opened at the west (Ogose) end of the platform in 2009.

Platforms

Adjacent stations

History
The station opened on 16 December 1934.

Platform edge sensors and TV monitors were installed in 2008 ahead of the start of driver-only operation on the Ogose Line from June 2008.

From 17 March 2012, station numbering was introduced on the Tōbu Ogose Line, with Higashi-Moro Station becoming "TJ-45".

Passenger statistics
In fiscal 2019, the station was used by an average of 5,637 passengers daily.

Surrounding area
 Moro Station (Hachikō Line) (approximately 15 minutes' walk away)
 Saitama Medical School Moroyama Campus

Bus services
Higashi-Moro Station is served by local Kawagoe Motor Corporation (KKJ) bus services from a bus stop in front of the station. It is also served by the "Moro Bus" community minibus (Yabusame Green Line and Yuzu Yellow Line) service.

See also
 List of railway stations in Japan

References

External links

  

Stations of Tobu Railway
Tobu Ogose Line
Railway stations in Saitama Prefecture
Railway stations in Japan opened in 1934
Moroyama, Saitama